Oleria estella, the Estella clearwing or Estella glasswing, is a species of clearwing (ithomiine) butterflies of the family Nymphalidae. It was first described by William Chapman Hewitson in 1868 and it is found from Venezuela to Bolivia in the eastern foothills of the Andes.

The larvae feed on Solanum species.

Subspecies
Oleria estella estella (Hewitson, [1868]) (eastern Ecuador and Peru)
Oleria estella subosa (Haensch, [1909]) (Bolivia)

References

Ithomiini
Nymphalidae of South America
Butterflies described in 1868